Japanese School in Moscow (Mosukuwa Nihonjin Gakkō) is a Japanese international school located in Lomonosovsky District, South-Western Administrative Okrug, Moscow.

It was established in 1967. It occupies the fourth and fifth floors of its building, which is also used by the Moscow Finnish School, the Swedish School in Moscow, and the Scuola Italiana Italo Calvino (Italian school). The campus also has a dining hall, an indoor gymnasium, a technical classroom, a playing field that doubles as a skating rink in the winter, and outdoor athletic fields.

See also

 Japanese people in Russia
 Japanese language education in Russia
 Russian Embassy School in Tokyo
 Japan–Russia relations

References

Further reading

 Askaryan, Anna. "Иностранные школы в Москве: японцы" (Archive).  (Теории и практики). December 12, 2011.

Independent sources:
 モスクワ日本人学校調査報告 ("Inquiry Report on Japanese School in Moscow"). 大阪教育大学社会学研究会 (Ōsaka Kyōiku Shakaigaku Kenkyūkai; Osaka Kyoiku University Sociological Workshop). 大阪教育大学社会学研究会編. 大阪教育大学比較社会研究室, 1998.7. NCID: BA6999366X. See profile at CiNii.
Non-independent sources:
 Noto, Masayuki (能登 政之). 校長室から一筆 : モスクワ日本人学校の思い出 ("A Note from the President's Room: Memories of Japanese School in Moscow"). 能登政之著. 北海道教育社, 1994.3. NCID, BN10617013. See profile at CiNii.
 大村 穣 (前モスクワ日本人学校校長・大阪府堺市百舌鳥小学校校長). "モスクワ日本人学校における教育活動の見直し : 在外における教育相談のキーステーションとしての日本人学校をめざして." 在外教育施設における指導実践記録 24, 138–142, 2001. Tokyo Gakugei University. See profile at CiNii.
 日原 万理子 (兵庫県出石町立弘道小学校・モスクワ日本人学校(前)). "モスクワ日本人学校における日本語指導(第5章日本語指導)." 在外教育施設における指導実践記録 27, 83–85, 2004. Tokyo Gakugei University. See profile at CiNii.

External links
 The Japanese School in Moscow 
 

International schools in Moscow
Moscow
Educational institutions established in 1967
Japan–Soviet Union relations
Japan–Russia relations
Schools in the Soviet Union
1967 establishments in the Soviet Union